Paul O'Connor (29 March 1963 – 20 September 2012) was an Irish hurler who played as a midfielder for the Cork senior team.

O'Connor joined the panel during the 1986 championship and became a regular player over the following three seasons. During that time he failed to claim any honours. He hurled for Cork between 1987 and 1990 but was deprived of an All-Ireland medal after suffering a serious knee injury just months before Cork's famous "double" of the Liam McCarthy and Sam Maguire Cups. But for this serious injury, O'Connor would have been one of the outstanding hurlers of the 1990s.

At club level O'Connor was a two-time county club championship medalist with Na Piarsaigh.

With University College Cork O'Connor won five consecutive Fitzgibbon Cup winners' medals. He is regarded as one of the competition's greatest-ever players.

References

1963 births
2012 deaths
Cork inter-county hurlers
Hurling managers
Na Piarsaigh hurlers
UCC hurlers